Carding a mechanical process that aligns cotton, wool or other fibers in the manufacture of textiles.

Carding may also refer to:

 Carding (fraud), a range of credit card fraud activities
 Carding (police policy), an intelligence gathering policy of certain Canadian police departments 
 Carding brush, used when rust bluing steel
 Carding Mill Valley, a small valley near Church Stretton, England
 Hole carding, advantage technique in the game of casino 21
 Carding, the use of signals in contract bridge
 Carding, in North America, requesting a customer to show an identity document as proof of age
 The Canadian Athlete Assistance Program, also called "the carding program", a program where elite athletes in Canada receive funding from the government